Levymanus is a genus of palp-footed spiders that was first described by S. Zonstein & Y. M. Marusik in 2013.  it contains only two species, found in the United Arab Emirates, Saudi Arabia, Israel, and Ethiopia: L. gershomi and L. ras.

See also
 List of Palpimanidae species

References

Araneomorphae genera
Palpimanidae
Spiders of Asia